Bioproduction is the production of biologics-based therapeutic drugs including protein-based therapeutics, vaccines, gene therapies as well as cell therapies;  drugs so complex they can only be made in living systems or indeed are a living system (cell therapies).  In practice, ‘bioproduction’ has become loosely synonymous with ‘bioprocessing’ as a way to describe the manufacturing process using, cell culture, chromatography, formulation and related analytical testing for large molecule drugs, vaccines and cellular therapies.  Many combinations of reactor types and culture modes are now available for use in bioproduction: e.g., pharming, rocking wave-agitated bag batch, stirred-tank or air-lift fed-batch, and hollow-fiber or spin-filter perfusion.  No single production format is inherently superior; that determination depends on many manufacturing capabilities, requirements, and goals.  New cell lines, concerns about product quality and safety, emerging biosimilars, worldwide demand for vaccines, and cellular medicine drive new innovative solutions in bioproduction.

See also
 Biomanufacturing
 Biopharmaceutical
 Biosimilar
 Biotechnology
 Good Manufacturing Practice

References

Biopharmaceuticals